Nicolás Lapentti was the defending champion, but did not participate this year.

Arnaud Clément won the tournament, beating Patrick Rafter 7–6(7–2), 7–6(7–5) in the final.

Seeds

Draw

Finals

Top half

Bottom half

References

 Main Draw
 Qualifying Draw

2000 ATP Tour